
Aristogeiton (lived 4th century BC) was an Athenian orator and adversary of Demosthenes and Dinarchus. His father, Scydimus, died in prison, as he was a debtor of the state and unable to pay: his son, Aristogeiton, who inherited the debt, was likewise imprisoned for some time. He is called a demagogue and a sycophant, and his eloquence is described as of a coarse and vehement character. His impudence drew upon him the surname of "the dog." He was often accused by Demosthenes and others, and defended himself in a number of orations which are lost. Among the extant speeches of Demosthenes there are two against Aristogeiton, and among those of Dinarchus there is one. The Suda mentions seven orations of Aristogeiton, and an eighth against Phryne is mentioned by Athenaeus. Aristogeiton died in prison.

Notes

References

Sources

External links
Dinarchus, Against Aristogeiton (Perseus Project)
Demosthenes, Against Aristogeiton 1 (Perseus Project)
Demosthenes, Against Aristogeiton 2 (Perseus Project)

4th-century BC Athenians
Ancient Greek rhetoricians
Demosthenes